Monod is a surname, and may refer to:

 Adolphe Monod (1802–1856), French Protestant churchman; brother of Frédéric Monod.
 Frédéric Monod (1794–1863), French Protestant pastor.
 Gabriel Monod, French historian
 Jacques Monod (1910–1976), French biologist and winner of the 1965 Nobel Prize in Physiology or Medicine.
 Jacques-Louis Monod (b. 1927), French musician.
 Jérôme Monod (1930-2016), French business executive and political advisor.
 Nicolas Monod, Swiss mathematician.
 Théodore Monod (1836–1921), French Protestant pastor and hymn writer; son of Frédéric Monod.
 Théodore André Monod (1902–2000), French naturalist, explorer, and humanist scholar; son of Théodore Monod.
 Wilfred Monod (1867-1943) French Protestant theologian